Marius Florian Ciobanu-Vanghele (born 31 March 2003) is a Romanian professional footballer who plays as a midfielder for Liga I side FC U Craiova 1948.

References

External links
 
 

2003 births
Living people
Footballers from Bucharest
Romanian footballers
Association football midfielders
Liga I players
Liga II players
FC Steaua București players
LPS HD Clinceni players
AFC Unirea Slobozia players
FC Universitatea Cluj players
FC U Craiova 1948 players